Murray Cockburn (born 17 October 1933) is a Canadian sprinter. He competed in the men's 400 metres at the 1956 Summer Olympics.

References

1933 births
Living people
Athletes (track and field) at the 1956 Summer Olympics
Canadian male sprinters
Olympic track and field athletes of Canada
Athletes from Toronto